Cajah's Mountain is a town in Caldwell County, North Carolina, United States. The population was 2,823 at the 2010 census. It is part of the Hickory–Lenoir–Morganton Metropolitan Statistical Area.

History
Cajah's Mountain was incorporated as a town in 1983.

Geography
Cajah's Mountain is located in southern Caldwell County at  (35.850057, -81.538718). It is bordered to the north by Lenoir, the county seat. Cajah Mountain, elevation , is a hill at the southern end of town next to Connelly Springs Road, the major north–south road through the town.

Demographics

2020 census

As of the 2020 United States census, there were 2,722 people, 1,184 households, and 753 families residing in the town.

2000 census
As of the census of 2000, there were 2,683 people, 996 households, and 726 families residing in the town. The population density was 877.4 people per square mile (338.5/km2). There were 1,043 housing units at an average density of 341.1 per square mile (131.6/km2). The racial makeup of the town was 95.19% White, 3.17% African American, 0.19% Native American, 0.56% Asian, 0.52% from other races, and 0.37% from two or more races. Hispanic or Latino of any race were 0.93% of the population.

There were 996 households, out of which 27.9% had children under the age of 18 living with them, 61.9% were married couples living together, 7.1% had a female householder with no husband present, and 27.1% were non-families. 23.5% of all households were made up of individuals, and 10.4% had someone living alone who was 65 years of age or older. The average household size was 2.38 and the average family size was 2.79.

In the town, the population was spread out, with 18.3% under the age of 18, 7.0% from 18 to 24, 32.5% from 25 to 44, 24.8% from 45 to 64, and 17.4% who were 65 years of age or older. The median age was 40 years. For every 100 females, there were 103.9 males. For every 100 females age 18 and over, there were 105.7 males.

The median income for a household in the town was $39,566, and the median income for a family was $43,462. Males had a median income of $31,156 versus $21,168 for females. The per capita income for the town was $17,909. About 8.8% of families and 11.2% of the population were below the poverty line, including 16.9% of those under age 18 and 10.4% of those age 65 or over.

References

External links
Town website

Towns in Caldwell County, North Carolina